Stange is a municipality in Innlandet county, Norway.

Stange may also refer to:

Places
Stange Ice Shelf, an ice shelf in Stange Sound in Antarctica
Stange Sound, a sound along the coast of Palmer Land in Antarctica
Stange or Stangebyen, a village in Stange Municipality in Innlandet county, Norway
Stange Church, a church in Stange Municipality in Innlandet county, Norway
Stange Commons, a municipal commons area in Stange Municipality in Innlandet county, Norway
Stange Station, a railway station in Stange Municipality in Innlandet county, Norway

Other
Stange (Glass), a tall, cylindrical glass traditionally used for drinking beer
Stange (surname), a list of people with the surname Stange
Stange SK, a sports club in Stange Municipality in Innlandet county, Norway